Gustav Schnürer (30 June 1860 – 14 December 1941) was a German-Swiss historian.

Biography
Gustav Schnürer was born in the Silesian village of Jätzdorf on 30 June 1860.

He studied history, geography and philology at the universities of Berlin, Breslau and Münster, earning his doctorate in 1883 at Münster. Afterwards, he worked as an editorial assistant at Munich, later obtaining a professorship in medieval history at the University of Fribourg (1889).

Schnürer is known for his studies of religious and religio-cultural history. His best known written work was Kirche und Kultur im Mittelalter, a book that was translated into English in 1956 by George J. Undreiner as Church and Culture in the Middle Ages: 350–814. 

He was co-founder of Deutschen Gesellschaft für christliche Kunst (German Society of Christian Art) (1893) and Zeitschrift für schweizerische Kirchengeschichte (Magazine of Swiss Church History) (1907). He was also a contributor to the Catholic Encyclopedia.

References

  English translation

External links
 

20th-century Swiss historians
Swiss male writers
People from the Province of Silesia
1860 births
1941 deaths
Academic staff of the University of Fribourg
University of Münster alumni
University of Breslau alumni
Contributors to the Catholic Encyclopedia
19th-century Swiss historians